Shelby Autrie Wilson (born July 14, 1937) is an American wrestler and Olympic champion.

Career
A native of Ponca City, Oklahoma, Wilson was a two-time Oklahoma state tournament runner-up while in high school, and was a two-time NCAA runner-up in college at Oklahoma A&M (now Oklahoma State). At the 1960 U.S. Olympic Trials, he finished in third place. During the Olympic Training Camp he successfully challenged the trials' second and first-place finishers to gain the starting position. He won Olympic Gold in Rome in the freestyle lightweight division. His Olympic gold medal was the first major tournament that Wilson had won. He later became a high school wrestling coach at Owen Valley Community High School.

In 1982, Wilson was inducted into the National Wrestling Hall of Fame as a Distinguished Member.

References

1937 births
Living people
Wrestlers at the 1960 Summer Olympics
American male sport wrestlers
Olympic gold medalists for the United States in wrestling
Sportspeople from Oklahoma
People from Ponca City, Oklahoma
Medalists at the 1960 Summer Olympics
Ponca City High School alumni